Barbara Ann Wilberforce (née Spooner; 24 December 1777 – 21 April 1847) was the spouse of abolitionist and MP William Wilberforce.

Early life
She was born in Birches Green, Erdington, Warwickshire, and died in The Vicarage, East Farleigh, Kent.
She was the eldest daughter and third child of Isaac Spooner of Elmdon Hall, Warwickshire, a banker of Birmingham, and his wife, Barbara Gough-Calthorpe, daughter of Sir Henry Gough, 1st Baronet, sister of Henry Gough-Calthorpe, 1st Baron Calthorpe and granddaughter of the MP Reynolds Calthorpe. 

On 15 April 1797, while at Bath, she met her future husband, William Wilberforce, to whom she had been recommended by Wilberforce's friend, Thomas Babington. The couple were married at St Swithins Church, Walcot, Bath on 30 May 1797.

Later life
She nearly died following an attack of typhoid in 1800, after which her health was never strong. Nevertheless, she bore six children, all of whom survived to adulthood. The children were William (July 1798), Barbara (1799), Elizabeth (1801), Robert (1802), Samuel (1805), and Henry (1807).

Following her husband's death in 1833, Barbara Wilberforce spent her time with her sons, Robert and Samuel, or with her sister Ann Neale in Taplow in Buckinghamshire. She died in The Vicarage, East Farleigh, Kent and is buried next to East Farleigh church, her son Robert Wilberforce's first benefice, and where her son Henry would minister a decade later.

Amazing Grace
In the 2006 film Amazing Grace, about her husband's involvement in the movement to eliminate the slave trade, she was portrayed by actress Romola Garai.

References

1777 births
1847 deaths
People from Birmingham, West Midlands
Barbara
19th-century English women
19th-century English people
18th-century English women
18th-century English people
People from East Farleigh